Arun Muraleedharan (born ry 1989)  is an Indian music composer who made his debut through the 2016 film Happy Wedding’. His second film was the Adventures of Omanakuttan directed by Rohith V.S. 

After completing his schooling from S.N.V Sanskrit Highersecondary School, Paravur. Arun joined Sreesankara University, Kalady and completed Graduation in Music.

Career 
He started his career in music composing first for the album Neelambari, while studying at college.  Happy Wedding is his debut as a Music director. He is best known for his hit song Aval from Kakshi: Amminippilla (2019) sung by Harishankar KS.

Filmography

As Music Director

Films

Short  Films 
 Whyga
 RIM
 Maniyara 
 Tale of Mathew Mannadan
 Who am I 
 Engane Thudangum 
 Kattapoka

References

External links 
 

Living people
Musicians from Kochi
Indian male composers
Place of birth missing (living people)
1989 births